Edgar Lungu became president on 25 January 2015 following the death of predecessor Michael Sata, after the Zambian presidential election, 2015. The following is a list of international presidential trips made by Edgar Lungu since assuming office. Edgar Lungu has been criticised by various local media outlets for travelling extensively, during bad economic times for Zambia.

Summary of international trips
Edgar Lungu has made several foreign trips during his tenure, mainly with a focus in the Southern African region.

2015

2016

First Term

Second Term 
The following international trips were made by Edgar Lungu in 2016 after being inaugurated on 13 September 2016.

2017 
The following is a list of international presidential trips made by Lungu in 2017.

References 

Edgar Lungu
2015 in international relations
2016 in international relations
2017 in international relations
Lungu, Edgar
Lungu, Edgar
 
Lungu, Edgar
Lungu